Kenan Yelek  (born 15 August 1975 in Giresun) is a Turkish football coach and former professional footballer who played as a centre back.

Club career
Yelek joined Samsunspor from Altay S.K. in August 2000, and has played for the club ever since.

International career
Yelek appeared in one match for the senior Turkey national football team, entering as a second-half substitute in a friendly against Denmark on 18 February 2004.

References

External links
Kenan Yelek at TFF
 

1975 births
Living people
Turkish footballers
Turkey international footballers
Zeytinburnuspor footballers
Altay S.K. footballers
Samsunspor footballers
Sportspeople from Giresun
Association football defenders
21st-century Turkish people